Strongg is a studio album by the Jamaican reggae band Black Uhuru. It was released in 1994 through Mesa Recordings. The album peaked at number 6 on the US Billboard Reggae Albums chart and was nominated for Grammy Award for Best Reggae Album at 37th Annual Grammy Awards.

Track listing

Personnel 

 Derrick "Duckie" Simpson – vocals, composer, producer
 Euvin Spencer – composer, arranger
 Rudolph "Garth" Dennis – composer
 Vincent Black – guitar (tracks: 1-9, 11-12)
 Leebert "Gibby" Morrison – guitar (track 10)
 Earl "Bagga" Walker – bass (tracks: 1-4, 8-9, 11)
 Derrick Barnett – bass (tracks: 5-6, 10, 12)
 Christopher Meridith – bass (track 7)
 Anthony Brissett – keyboards (tracks: 1, 3, 5-7, 10-12), producer (tracks: 1, 6, 12)
 Keith Sterling-McLeod – keyboards (tracks: 2-5, 8-9)
 Dean Fraser – horns (tracks: 1, 3, 6, 10)
 Rass Brass – horns (track 1)
 Sydney Wolfe – horns (track 7), percussion (tracks: 1-9, 11-12)
 Jermaine Forde – drums (tracks: 1, 6, 10)
 Marcus "Rangatan" Smith – drums (tracks: 2-5, 7-9, 11)
 Lowell Fillmore Dunbar – drums (tracks: 10, 12)
 Christopher "Sky Juice" Blake – percussion (track 10)
 George Nauful – executive producer
 Jim Snowden – executive producer
 Steven J. C. Stanley – mixing
 Junior Edwards – engineering
 Yasus Afari – arranging (track 1)
 Richard Tate – arranging (track 10)
 Michelle Laurencot – art direction & design
 Daniel Nevins – artwork

Charts

References

External links 

1994 albums
Black Uhuru albums